Nik Zul Aziz bin Nik Nawawi (born 7 April 1987) is a Malaysian footballer currently playing for Kuala Lumpur FA in Malaysia Premier League.

References

External links
 

1987 births
Living people
Malaysian footballers
Terengganu FC players
People from Terengganu
Sri Pahang FC players
PKNS F.C. players
Malaysia Super League players
Association football defenders